Ronald James Milner (born 16 May 1927) was the Bishop of Burnley from 1988 to 1993.

Education and career
He was educated at Hull Grammar School and Pembroke College, Cambridge before embarking on an ecclesiastical career with the post of Succentor at Sheffield Cathedral, after which he was Vicar of Westwood .  He then became Vicar of St James Fletchampstead. Following this he was Rector of St Mary's, Southampton and then (his final appointment before ordination to the episcopate) Archdeacon of Lincoln. In retirement he continues to serve as an assistant bishop within the Diocese of Southwell and Nottingham.

References

1927 births
Alumni of Pembroke College, Cambridge
People educated at Hull Grammar School
Bishops of Burnley
20th-century Church of England bishops
Possibly living people